Rasheed Seidu Inusa is a Ghanaian diplomat and a member of the New Patriotic Party of Ghana. He is currently Ghana's Ambassador-at-large.

Ambassadorial appointment 
In July 2017, President Nana Akuffo-Addo named Rasheed Inusa as Ghana's Ambassador-at-large. He was among twenty two other distinguished Ghanaians who were named to head various diplomatic Ghanaian mission in the world.

References

Year of birth missing (living people)
Living people
Ghanaian Muslims
Ghanaian diplomats
New Patriotic Party politicians